Raphitoma melitis is a species of sea snail, a marine gastropod mollusk in the family Raphitomidae.

Description
The length of the shell attains 6.9 mm.

Distribution
This marine species occurs in the Aegean Sea

References

 Kontadakis C., Mbazios G., Polyzoulis G. & Manousis T. (2019). Two new species of Raphitoma (Gastropoda: Conoidea: Raphitomidae) from the Greek Seas. Xenophora Taxonomy. 25: 26-36.

External links
 Manousis T., Kontadakis C., Mbazios G. & Polyzoulis G. (2018). The family Raphitomidae (Mollusca: Gastropoda: Conoidea) in the Greek Seas with the description of two new species. Journal of Biological Research-Thessaloniki. 25(1): DOI 10.1186/s40709-018-0085-3
 Biolib.cz: Raphitoma melitis

melitis
Gastropods described in 2019